This article lists important figures and events in Malayan public affairs during the year 1962, together with births and deaths of significant Malayans.

Incumbent political figures

Federal level
Yang di-Pertuan Agong: Tuanku Syed Putra of Perlis
Raja Permaisuri Agong: Tuanku Budririah of Perlis
Prime Minister: Tunku Abdul Rahman Putra Al-Haj
Deputy Prime Minister: Datuk Abdul Razak

State level
 Sultan of Johor: Sultan Ismail
 Sultan of Kedah: Sultan Abdul Halim Muadzam Shah
 Sultan of Kelantan: Sultan Yahya Petra
 Raja of Perlis: Tuanku Syed Sirajuddin (Regent)
 Sultan of Perak: Sultan Yusuf Izzuddin Shah
 Sultan of Pahang: Sultan Abu Bakar
 Sultan of Selangor: Sultan Salahuddin Abdul Aziz Shah
 Sultan of Terengganu: Sultan Ismail Nasiruddin Shah (Deputy Yang di-Pertuan Agong)
 Yang di-Pertuan Besar of Negeri Sembilan: Tuanku Munawir
 Yang di-Pertua Negeri (Governor) of Penang: Raja Tun Uda
 Yang di-Pertua Negeri (Governor) of Malacca: Tun Leong Yew Koh

(Source: Malaysian Department of Informations)

Events 
 19 January – Dato' Onn Jaafar the founder of UMNO died. His body was laid to rest at Makam Mahmoodiah, Johor Bahru.
 19 January – Parti Negara was dissolved after the death of Dato' Onn Jaafar.
 February – The Cobbold Commission was established.
 7 April – The World United Against Malaria campaign was commemorated on a Malayan stamp.
 10 April – Stadium Negara, Malaya's first indoor stadium was officially opened.
 21 April – The United Democratic Party (Malaysia) was founded (dissolved in 1968).
 17 May –  The Institut Pendidikan Guru Kampus Pendidikan Teknik Cheras was established.
 1 October – Free primary education was introduced in Malaya.
 24 August – 4 September – Malaya competed at the 1962 Asian Games held in Jakarta, Indonesia and ranked eighth overall with two gold medals, four silver medals and nine bronze medals.
 1 September – The Singaporean integration referendum was held in preparation for the formation of Malaysia.
 13 September – Tan Sri Aishah Ghani became the first woman appointed as senator.
 11 September – Tun Abdul Razak Hussein represented the country at the Commonwealth Prime Minister's Conference in London.
 22 November – 1 December – Malaya competed at the 1962 British Empire and Commonwealth Games in Perth, Western Australia and won a bronze medal in weightlifting sports.
 24 December - Beginning of a three-week strike by staff of the Malayan Railways over wages. It is the longest industrial action in Malayan history to date. The strike ended on 16 January the following year.
 Unknown date – Darul Aman Stadium, Kedah was officially opened.
 Unknown date – Minconsult, a private limited engineering consultancy was founded. One of its notable projects was Sultan Salahuddin Abdul Aziz Power Station.
 Unknown date – SMK Aminuddin Baki, Johor Bahru was established.
 Unknown date – Tasek Corporation Berhad was founded as Tasek Cement Limited, one of Malaysia's largest cement producers.

Sports
 8–9 September – 1962 Merdeka Tournament
 16–17 September – 1962 Malayan Grand Prix. The first Malaysian Grand Prix held.
 Unknown date – 1962 Malaysia Cup

Births
 22 January – Sultan Mizan Zainal Abidin of Terengganu – 13th Yang di-Pertuan Agong (2006–2011)
 29 January – Karamjit Singh – Malaysian Number 1 rally driver
 19 March – Norsehah binti Abu Bakar – Freedom Group singer (died 2006)
 22 March – Zambry Abdul Kadir – Menteri Besar of Perak (2009–2018)
 18 April – Nassier Wahab – Singer
 12 May – Nordin Mohamed Jadi – Former Malaysian track sprinter
 15 May – Suhaimi Sulaiman – TV personality
 15 May – Zulkiflee Anwar Haque (Zunar) – Cartoonist
 29 May – Razif Sidek – Badminton player
 6 August – Michelle Yeoh – International actress
 24 August – Saw Teong Hin – Director
 10 October – Ogy Ahmad Daud – Actress
 2 October – Aziz M. Osman – Actor and director
 6 November – Aznil Nawawi – Popular host TV
 5 December – Jafri Malin Abdullah – Scientist
 Unknown date – Sheila Mambo – Actress
 Unknown date – Susan Lankester – Actress

Deaths
 19 January – Dato' Onn Jaafar, seventh Menteri Besar of Johor and first President of the United Malays National Organisation
 14 November – Dato' Sayyid Alwi Thahir al-Haddad, former Johor State Mufti

See also
 1962 
 1961 in Malaya | 1963 in Malaysia
 History of Malaysia

References

 
Years of the 20th century in Malaysia
Malaya
1960s in Malaya
Malaya